Cem Filiz (born 30 November 1980), better known by his stage name Cem Adrian, is a Turkish musician of Bosniak origin, singer-songwriter and record producer.

Early life
His father was a merchant, while his mother was a housewife. Adrian was born to a family from Bosnia in Edirne, as the second child of his parents. His real name is Cem Filiz. Adrian chose his stage name after Adrianople, the original name of Edirne in ancient times. He later met Fazıl Say through Demet Sağıroğlu, and with Say's invitation, he enrolled in Bilkent University's Department of Performing Arts.

Career

Career beginnings
In 2003, he worked as a soloist and dancer for the group Mystica. In February 2005, he released his first album, Ben Bu Şarkıyı Sana Yazdım. This album includes the songs which Adrian had recorded by himself between 1997 and 2003 in Edirne. In January 2006, he started working on his second self-produced album. Aşk Bu Gece Şehri Terk Etti, which contained 13 songs written by himself, was released in December 2006. Artists Umay Umay, Denizhan and Suicide were featured on three of the album's songs.

In 2008 he released two albums, Seçkiler (Essentials) and Emir, and produced the music for Abdullah Oğuz's film Sıcak, where he also played the role of a young imam.

Recent years

On 30 December 2015, his first single album İlk ve Son Kez, which contained two songs, was released on internet. One of the songs was "İlk ve Son Kez", which was previously published, while the other was a new version of "Sessizce", which was originally included in the album Aşk Bu Gece Şehri Terk Etti.

On 21 January 2016, his album Seçkiler 2 was released by Dokuz Sekiz Müzik. In September 2016, he announced the release date of his album Tuz Buz to be September 2017, but it was eventually released in November 2017.

In 2017, to raise money for a child's surgery, Adrian together with Manuş Baba, Ceylan Ertem, Mabel Matiz and Derya Köroğlu gave a concert under the title "Bir Çocuk İçin Şarkılar (Songs for a Child)".

Image
Adrian is among the artists who have publicly spoken about censorship in Turkey, freedom of speech and human rights. In response to questions regarding his sexuality, he said: "Is it possible for a man who sings with a high pitched voice to not face such comments?" His album Kayıp Çocuk Masalları, which was released in 2010, featured a cover that had an LGBT theme about which he said: 

After facing criticism for supporting the LGBT community in 2010, he said: "Actually I have a problem with those who have issues with people's sexual identity." In 2012, he recorded a music video for the song "Yalnızlık" from his album Siyah Bir Veda Öpücüğü, in which a transgender woman was shown. There was also a scene involving a young guy masturbating, which was meant to imply loneliness, the title of the song.

Discography

Studio albums
 Ben Bu Şarkıyı Sana Yazdım (I Wrote This Song To You) (2005)
 Aşk Bu Gece Şehri Terk Etti (Love Has Left The City Tonight) (2006)
 Essentials / Seçkiler (Essentials) (2008)
 Emir (The Behest) (2008)
 Kayıp Çocuk Masalları (Lost Children Fictions) (2010)
 Siyah Bir Veda Öpücügü (A Black Farewell Kiss) (2012)
 Şeker Prens ve Tuz Kral (The Sugar Prince and The Saline King) (2013)
 Cam Havli (Glass rush) (2014, with Umay Umay)
 Sana Bunları Hiç Bilmediğin Bir Yerden Yazıyorum (I Write These from Somewhere You Don't Know) (2014)
 Essentials / Seçkiler 2 (2016)
 Tuz Buz (Salt-Ice) (2017)
 Solmayan Şarkılar (Songs that Don't Fade) (2020)
 Gökyüzümün Yıldızları (Stars of My Sky) (2022)

Remix albums 
 Remixes 1 (2020)
 Her Yer Kül (2022)

Live albums 
 Cem Adrian Canlı (2021)

EPs 
 2015: Yalnızlık Senden Daha Çok Seviyor Beni (Loneliness loves me more than you do) (2015)

Singles 

 2015: İlk ve Son Kez
 2016: Siyah Beyaz
 2018: Kalbim Çukurda (with Gazapizm)
 2018: Essentials / Seçkiler 3
 2018: Sen Benim Şarkılarımsın (feat. Hande Mehan)
 2018: Geri Dönme (feat. Kalben)
 2018: Yolun Sonu Görünüyor (feat. Musa Eroğlu)
 2018: Kirpiğin Kaşına Değdiği Zaman (feat. Ahmet Aslan)
 2019: Ah Bu Şarkıların Gözü Kör Olsun (feat. Hande Mehan)
 2019: Kum Gibi (feat. Hande Mehan)
 2019: O Yar Gelir (feat. Zeynep Karababa)
 2019: Bu Yollar Hep Sana Çıkar (feat. Hande Mehan)
 2019: Bana Sorma (feat. Melek Mosso)
 2020: Hüzün Kovan Kuşu
 2020: Yeniden (with Şanışer)
 2020: Bu Şarkı Aşka Yazıldı
 2020: Tutacağım Ellerini (feat. Halil Sezai & Hayko Cepkin)
 2020: Yarim Gurbete Gider (feat. Celo Boluz)
 2020: Kirpiğin Kaşına Değdiği Zaman (feat. Ahmet Aslan) [Emrah Turken Remix]
 2020: Yalnız Adam
 2020: Kara Toprak (feat. Deeperise & Şanışer)
 2020: Yolun Sonunda
 2020: Hatırla (with Sezgin Alkan)
 2020: Ölüm ile Yaşam (with Anıl Piyancı)
 2020: Dön Dünya (with Şehinşah)
 2021: Kül (with Mark Eliyahu)
 2021: Bükülüyor Zaman
 2021: Gesi Bağları
 2021: Yine mi Yol (feat. Sena Şener)
 2021: Bir Kar Tanesi
 2021: Kanatlar (with Yung Kafa & Kücük Efendi)
 2021: Pervane (feat. Günay Acar)
 2021: Ağlasam mı
 2021: Bitlis'te Beş Minare (with Çiğdem Sarvazlar)
 2021: Kim Daha Çok Seviyor (Çelik Şarkıları)
 2021: Derinlerde (with Mark Eliyahu)
 2021: Kimse Bilmez (with Mehmet Güreli)
 2021: Değmen Benim [Hayri Darar & Çağrı Baki Remix]
 2021: Salvatore
 2021: Ayrılık
 2021: Gemiler
 2022: Çığlık Çığlığa
 2022: Çember (Yeni Türkü Zamansız)
 2022: En Çok Seni
 2022: Hüzün (with Levent Özkazanç)
 2022: Öyle Yalnız (with Hande Mehan)
 2022: Sevme Beni (with Lara Çayan)
 2022: Gül
 2022: Karanlık Orman (with Trangela)
 2022: Bana Unutmayı Anlat (with Emir Can İğrek)
 2022: Bana Seni Gerek Seni
 2022: Zincir
 2022: Keskin
 2022: Sevdim Seni Bir Kere (with Hande Mehan)
 2022: Düştüm (Live) (with Şanışer)
 2022: Gönül (with Ezgi Kosa)
 2022: Emanet
 2022: Ben Sana Veda Edemem (with Çağan Şengül)
 2022: Kendine İyi Bak (with Ecem Erkek)
 2022: Gam Elinden Benim Zülfü Siyahım (Live)
 2023: Viran (with Derya Bedavacı)
 2023: Bu Gece Benimle Ölür Müsün (with Perdenin Ardındakiler)
 2023: Sızı
 2023: Bir Ay Doğar (with Yunus Kırmacı)

Guest appearances
 Made in Turkey Vol. IV (selection)
 Al Fadimem (folk song, from album Essentials)
 Lora: Bir Kadının Portresi
 Sis
 Artun Ertürk & Diplomatik Rock Opera
 Sevgisizlik
 Tetik: Ta Kendisi
 Beş kişi arabada
 Soner Canözer & Prag Filarmoni Orkestrası: Masalcı’nın On Beş Yılı (2009)
 Kaf Dağının Ardında
 Fazıl Say featuring Güvenç Dağüstün, Burcu Uyar and Selva Erdener
 İnsan İnsan
 Mahzuni'ye Saygı (2017)
 Dumanlı Dumanlı

References

Notes

External links

  
 Showcase profile

1980 births
Living people
Turkish LGBT rights activists
Turkish male singer-songwriters
Alternative rock musicians
Turkish record producers
Turkish rock musicians
People from Edirne
21st-century Turkish male singers